Sir William Paston, 1st Baronet, (1528–1610) was an English benefactor, and the father of Robert Paston, 1st Earl of Yarmouth.

Paston was educated at Gonville Hall, Cambridge, in 1546. In 1554 he inherited the family estates. He was Sheriff of Norfolk and Suffolk in 1565 and knighted on 22 August 1578.

He founded North Walsham Grammar School in 1606. The school has a portrait of him by an unknown artist, which shows him "venerable in his civilian attire of sober black" (Forder, p. 11). He died on 20 October 1610.

References

1528 births
1610 deaths
Alumni of Gonville and Caius College, Cambridge
William